Mid Scotland and Fife is one of the eight electoral regions of the Scottish Parliament which were created in 1999. Nine of the parliament's 73 first past the post constituencies are sub-divisions of the region and it elects seven of the 56 additional-member Members of the Scottish Parliament (MSPs). Thus it elects a total of 16 MSPs.

The Mid Scotland and Fife region shares boundaries with the Central Scotland, Highlands and Islands, North East Scotland and West of Scotland regions and is connected with the Lothian region by bridges across the Firth of Forth.

Constituencies and council areas

2011–present
As a result of the First Periodic Review of Scottish Parliament Boundaries the boundaries for the region and constituencies were redrawn for the 2011 Scottish Parliament election.

1999–2011
The constituencies were created in 1999 with the names and boundaries of Westminster constituencies, as existing in at that time. The Holyrood constituencies cover all of three council areas, the Clackmannanshire council area, the Fife council area and the Stirling council area, most of the Perth and Kinross council area and part of the Angus council area.

The rest of the Angus council area is within the North East Scotland electoral region.

Members of the Scottish Parliament

Constituency MSPs

Regional List MSPs
N.B. This table is for presentation purposes only

Election results

2021 Scottish Parliament election

Constituency results
{| class=wikitable
!colspan=4 style=background-color:#f2f2f2|2021 Scottish Parliament election: Mid Scotland and Fife
|-
! colspan=2 style="width: 200px"|Constituency
! style="width: 150px"|Elected member
! style="width: 300px"|Result

Additional member results

2016 Scottish Parliament election

In the 2016 Scottish Parliament election the region elected MSPs as follows:
 8 Scottish National Party MSPs (all constituency members)
 4 Conservative MSP (all additional members)
 2 Labour MSPs (all additional members)
 1 Liberal Democrat MSP (constituency member)
 1 Scottish Greens MSP (additional member)

Constituency results 
{| class=wikitable
!colspan=4 style=background-color:#f2f2f2|2016 Scottish Parliament election: Mid Scotland and Fife
|-
! colspan=2 style="width: 200px"|Constituency
! style="width: 150px"|Elected member
! style="width: 300px"|Result

Additional member results
{| class=wikitable
!colspan=8 style=background-color:#f2f2f2|2016 Scottish Parliament election: Mid Scotland and Fife
|-
! colspan="2" style="width: 150px"|Party
! Elected candidates
! style="width: 40px"|Seats
! style="width: 40px"|+/−
! style="width: 50px"|Votes
! style="width: 40px"|%
! style="width: 40px"|+/−%
|-

2011 Scottish Parliament election

In the 2011 Scottish Parliament election the region elected MSPs as follows:
 9 Scottish National Party MSPs (eight constituency members and one additional members)
 4 Labour MSPs (one constituency members and three additional members)
 2 Conservative MSP (both additional members)
 1 Liberal Democrat MSPs (additional member)

Constituency results 
{| class=wikitable
!colspan=4 style=background-color:#f2f2f2|2011 Scottish Parliament election: Mid Scotland and Fife
|-
! colspan=2 style="width: 200px"|Constituency
! style="width: 150px"|Elected member
! style="width: 300px"|Result

Additional member results
{| class=wikitable
!colspan=8 style=background-color:#f2f2f2|2011 Scottish Parliament election: Mid Scotland and Fife
|-
! colspan="2" style="width: 150px"|Party
! Elected candidates
! style="width: 40px"|Seats
! style="width: 40px"|+/−
! style="width: 50px"|Votes
! style="width: 40px"|%
! style="width: 40px"|+/−%
|-

2007 Scottish Parliament election
In the 2007 Scottish Parliament election the region elected MSPs as follows:
In the 2003 Scottish Parliament election the region elected MSPs as follows:
 6 Scottish National Party MSPs (five constituency members and one additional members)
 5 Labour MSPs (two constituency members and three additional members)
 3 Conservative MSP (all additional members)
 2 Liberal Democrat MSPs (both constituency members)

Constituency results 
{| class=wikitable
!colspan=4 style=background-color:#f2f2f2|2007 Scottish Parliament election: Mid Scotland and Fife
|-
! colspan=2 style="width: 200px"|Constituency
! style="width: 150px"|Elected member
! style="width: 300px"|Result

Additional member results
{| class=wikitable
!colspan=8 style=background-color:#f2f2f2|2007 Scottish Parliament election: Mid Scotland and Fife
|-
! colspan="2" style="width: 150px"|Party
! Elected candidates
! style="width: 40px"|Seats
! style="width: 40px"|+/−
! style="width: 50px"|Votes
! style="width: 40px"|%
! style="width: 40px"|+/−%
|-

2003 Scottish Parliament election
In the 2003 Scottish Parliament election the region elected MSPs as follows:

 5 Labour MSPs (all constituency members)
 5 Scottish National Party MSPs (3 constituency members and 2 additional members)
 3 Conservative MSP (all additional members)
 2 Liberal Democrat MSPs (one constituency member and one additional member)
 1 Scottish Greens MSP (additional member)

Constituency results
{| class=wikitable
!colspan=4 style=background-color:#f2f2f2|2003 Scottish Parliament election: Mid Scotland and Fife
|-
! colspan=2 style="width: 200px"|Constituency
! style="width: 150px"|Elected member
! style="width: 300px"|Result

Additional member results
{| class=wikitable
!colspan=8 style=background-color:#f2f2f2|2003 Scottish Parliament election: Mid Scotland and Fife
|-
! colspan="2" style="width: 150px"|Party
! Elected candidates
! style="width: 40px"|Seats
! style="width: 40px"|+/−
! style="width: 50px"|Votes
! style="width: 40px"|%
! style="width: 40px"|+/−%
|-
 
 
 
 
 
 
  
  
 
 
 
 
 
 
 

Changes:
 Andrew Arbuckle replaced Keith Raffan. Raffan resigned from the Parliament in January 2005. Arbuckle was next on the Liberal Democrats' list.
 Brian Monteith resigned from the Conservatives in July 2005, and served the remainder of the term as an Independent MSP.

1999 Scottish Parliament election
In the 1999 Scottish Parliament election the region elected MSPs as follows:

 6 Labour MSPs (six constituency members)
 5 Scottish National Party MSPs (two constituency members three additional members)
 3 Conservative MSP (three additional members)
 2 Liberal Democrat MSPs (one constituency member and one additional member)

Constituency results
{| class=wikitable
!colspan=4 style=background-color:#f2f2f2|1999 Scottish Parliament election: Mid Scotland and Fife
|-
! colspan=2 style="width: 200px"|Constituency
! style="width: 150px"|Elected member
! style="width: 300px"|Result

Additional member results
{| class=wikitable
!colspan=8 style=background-color:#f2f2f2|1999 Scottish Parliament election: Mid Scotland and Fife
|-
! colspan="2" style="width: 150px"|Party
! Elected candidates
! style="width: 40px"|Seats
! style="width: 40px"|+/−
! style="width: 50px"|Votes
! style="width: 40px"|%
! style="width: 40px"|+/−%
|-
 
 
 
 
 
 
  
  
 

Changes:
Murdo Fraser replaced Nick Johnston, who had resigned from the Parliament on 10 August 2001 due to ill health. Fraser was next on the Conservative and Unionist list.

Footnotes

Scottish Parliamentary regions
Politics of Angus, Scotland
Politics of Clackmannanshire
Politics of Fife
Politics of Perth and Kinross
Politics of Stirling (council area)
Scottish Parliament constituencies and regions 1999–2011
Scottish Parliament constituencies and regions from 2011